Vincent Brooks may refer to:

 Vincent K. Brooks (born 1958), American military officer
 Vincent Brooks, Victorian era painter and owner of the lithography firm Vincent Brooks, Day & Son
 Vincent Brooks, protagonist of Catherine